Ridge Island is a ridge-shaped island, 6 nautical miles (11 km) long and 1.5 nautical miles (2.8 km) wide lying 3 nautical miles (6 km) east of Pourquoi Pas Island in the center of Bourgeois Fjord, off the west coast of Graham Land. Discovered and named by the British Graham Land Expedition (BGLE), 1934–37, under Rymill.

See also 
 List of Antarctic and sub-Antarctic islands
 

Islands of Graham Land
Fallières Coast